Anne-Marie Charvet (born 1947) is a French civil servant (prefect).

She is born on 20 March 1947 in Marseille, Bouches-du-Rhône, Provence-Alpes-Côte-d'Azur.

Career 
 2004-2005 : prefect (préfète) of Tarn-et-Garonne in Montauban
 2009-2012 : prefect (préfète) of Aude (the first woman prefect or préfète of this department) in Carcassonne

Honours and awards
 :
 Chevalier (Knight) of Légion d’honneur

Sources, Notes, References

1947 births
People from Marseille
Living people
Prefects of France
Prefects of Tarn-et-Garonne
Prefects of Aude
Chevaliers of the Légion d'honneur